The women's 100 metre freestyle competition of the swimming events at the 1971 Pan American Games took place on 11 August. The last Pan American Games champion was Erika Bricker of US.

This race consisted of two lengths of the pool, both lengths being in freestyle.

Results
All times are in minutes and seconds.

Heats

Final 
The final was held on August 11.

References

Swimming at the 1971 Pan American Games
Pan